The 2018 West Lancashire Borough Council election took place on 3 May 2018 to elect members of West Lancashire Borough Council in England. This was on the same day as other local elections. Labour retained control of the council, while gaining two seats from the Conservatives, with localist party Our West Lancashire gaining one seat in Derby from the Conservatives.

Election result

Ward results

Ashurst

Aughton and Downholland

Aughton Park

Burscough East

Burscough West

Derby

Hesketh-with-Becconsall

Knowsley

Moorside

Newburgh

North Meols

Parbold

Scarisbrick

Scott

Skelmersdale South

Tanhouse

Tarleton

Up Holland

References

West Lancashire
West Lancashire Borough Council elections